Andrew Bowie McCrae (30 December 1886 – 17 November 1915) was a Scottish professional footballer who played in the Scottish League for Queen's Park and Falkirk as an outside right.

Personal life 
McCrae was educated at High School of Dundee, University of St Andrews and University of Dundee. He studied arts and law at the latter institution and later worked for solicitors Gair & Gibson in Falkirk. After the outbreak of the First World War, McCrae enlisted in the Lovat Scouts in September 1914 and was deployed to Gallipoli in September 1915. He had been serving as an acting corporal when he died of wounds suffered at Suvla on 17 November 1915. He was buried in Lala Baba Cemetery.

Career statistics

References

Scottish footballers
1915 deaths
British Army personnel of World War I
British military personnel killed in World War I
1886 births
Sportspeople from St Andrews
Lovat Scouts soldiers
Scottish Football League players
Association football outside forwards
Queen's Park F.C. players
Falkirk F.C. players
People educated at the High School of Dundee
Alumni of the University of St Andrews
Alumni of the University of Dundee
Burials at Lala Baba Commonwealth War Graves Commission Cemetery
Military personnel from Dundee
Footballers from Fife